A nonfood crop, also known as industrial crop, is a crop grown to produce goods for manufacturing, for example  fibre for clothing, rather than food for consumption.

Purpose
Industrial crops is a designation given to an enterprise that attempts to raise farm sector income, and provide economic development activities for rural areas. Industrial crops also attempt to provide products that can be used as substitutes for imports from other nations.

Diversity 

The range of crops with non-food uses is broad, but includes traditional arable crops like wheat, as well as less conventional crops like hemp and Miscanthus. Products made from non-food crops can be categorised by function:

See also

 Biofuel
 Bioplastics
 Biopolymer
 Cash crops
 Cellulosic biofuel
 Energy crop
 Food vs fuel
 Helix of sustainability
 Intensive crop farming
 National Non-Food Crops Centre
 Renewable Energy

References

External links
 Industrial Crops and Products Journal

Crops